John Minsheu (or Minshew) (1560–1627) was an English linguist and lexicographer.

Biography
He was born and died in London. Little is known about his life. He published some of the earliest dictionaries and grammars of the Spanish language for speakers of English. His major work was the Ductor in linguas (Guide into tongues), an eleven-language dictionary. With his Ductor in linguas he is also one of the first known inventors of the use of subscription as a method of funding publication of a book.

He also expanded Richard Percivale's Spanish dictionary.

Works 
 Joyful Newes out of the Newe Founde Worlde (1577)
 Spanish Grammar (1599)
 Dictionarie in Spanish and English (1599 & 1623), an augmented version of Bibliotheca Hispanica (1591) by Richard Percyvall
 Ductor in linguas (The Guide into Tongues) (1617)
 including Vocabularium Hispanicolatinum et Anglicum copiossissimum (A Most Copious Spanish Dictionarie with Latine and English)
 Pleasant and Delightfull Dialogues in Spanish and English (1623)

References

Sources 
 Jürgen Schäfer, John Minsheu: Scholar or Charlatan?, in Renaissance Quarterly, Vol. 26, No. 1 (Spring, 1973), pp. 23–35.
 GIGA Quotes
 Some Notes on the Life and Work of John Minsheu (1560–1627)*, Vivian Salmon, London (PDF)

External links 
 Online version of Minsheu's Spanish-English dictionary at King's College, London
 Example of a page from 1617 ed. of Ductor in Linguas

1560 births
1627 deaths
Writers from London
English lexicographers
16th-century English writers
Linguists from England
British Hispanists